Juan Carlos de Lima del Castillo (born May 2, 1962 in Florida, Uruguay) is a former Uruguayan footballer who has played at club level in Uruguay, Brazil, Chile and Ecuador.

Teams
  España de Florida 1982
  Liverpool 1983-1984
  U. Católica 1985-1986
  Deportivo Quito 1986
  Universidad Católica 1987
  Botafogo 1988
  Nacional 1988-1989
  Emelec 1991-1992
  O´Higgins 1993
  Defensor Sporting 1994
  Peñarol 1997-1999

External links
 

1962 births
Living people
Uruguayan footballers
Uruguayan expatriate footballers
Peñarol players
Club Nacional de Football players
Defensor Sporting players
Liverpool F.C. (Montevideo) players
C.S. Emelec footballers
S.D. Quito footballers
C.D. Universidad Católica del Ecuador footballers
Botafogo de Futebol e Regatas players
O'Higgins F.C. footballers
Club Deportivo Universidad Católica footballers
Expatriate footballers in Chile
Expatriate footballers in Brazil
Expatriate footballers in Ecuador
Association football forwards